Ali Fazal (born 15 October 1986) is an Indian actor and model who primarily appears in Hindi films. He made his screen debut with a small role in the English language film The Other End of the Line before appearing in the American television miniseries Bollywood Hero. He was seen in films like Always Kabhi Kabhi (2011), Baat Ban Gayi (2013), and Bobby Jasoos (2014). His first success came in Fukrey (2013) and Sonali Cable (2014).

Fazal made his Bollywood debut with a cameo appearance in 3 Idiots (2009) and next appeared in Always Kabhi Kabhi (2011).
He played the leading role in the horror film Khamoshiyan (2015) followed by his first American film Furious 7 (2015), and Happy Bhag Jayegi opposite Diana Penty in 2016. Fazal starred in the British-American film Victoria & Abdul, which depicts the relationship of Queen Victoria (Judi Dench) and her confidant, Indian servant Abdul Karim (Fazal). The film premiered at the Venice Film Festival in 2017. The costumes worn by the lead actors in the film have been added as part of the official display at Osborne House.

Fazal is popularly recognized for playing the character of Guddu Pandit in the Amazon Prime Video crime thriller Mirzapur.

Early life and education 
Ali Fazal was born in Sir Gangaram Hospital, Delhi, and grew up in  Lucknow, Uttar Pradesh. For a very brief period, he went to International Indian School, Dammam. He also went to La Martiniere College in Lucknow, Uttar Pradesh, and then moved to the all-boys boarding school, The Doon School in Dehradun, Uttarakhand. At Doon, he took up acting and participated in many Founder's Day theatre productions. He is said to have "found his calling" when he played the role of Trinculo, the jester in William Shakespeare's The Tempest. After Doon, Fazal went to Mumbai and graduated in economics from St. Xavier's College.

Personal life 

In February 2015, Fazal joined a Cancerthon organised by NDTV and Fortis to create awareness about cancer and raise funds for children battling the disease. He has though now left the work. Along with Tochi Raina, Fazal participated in a musical concert to raise funds for victims of the earthquake in Nepal.

Fazal is Muslim, he performed Umrah in January 2022. He shared his journey to Mecca and Medina on Instagram.

In 2014, Fazal made an entry in The Times of India'''s listing of the "Most Desirable Man". In 2019 Power Brands honored Fazal with “Power Brand: Industry Trendsetter” at BFJA (Bollywood Film Journalist's Awards). On 17 June 2020, Fazal's mother died due to health complications in Lucknow. Ali Fazal's grandfather died on Saturday 24 April 2021.

Fazal had been in a relationship with Richa Chadha, though their marriage plans had to be postponed due to the COVID-19 pandemic. On 23 September 2022, he and Chadha announced their impending marriage and said that the ceremony would be eco-friendly.
On 4 October 2022, they married in a ceremony in Lucknow.

 Career 
 2008–11: early work 
Fazal appeared in a small role in the James Dodson—directed romantic comedy film The Other End of the Line (2008). The film was a critical and commercial failure. He next appeared in the American television miniseries Bollywood Hero (2009) where he portrayed the role of Monty Kapoor. During his second year of college, Saeed Akhtar Mirza saw him in a play and picked him for the lead of erotic thriller Ek Tho Chance (2009), alongside Amrita Arora and Saurabh Shukla. The film focused on the realities and comedies inherent in life in Mumbai. The film premiered at the 14th International Film Festival of Kerala.

The same year, Fazal made his Bollywood film debut with Rajkumar Hirani's National Film Award-winning 3 Idiots, a film loosely based on the novel Five Point Someone by Chetan Bhagat. He was doing a theatre play at Prithvi Theatre in Juhu, when a person from the film's production unit noticed him and referred him to Hirani. Co-starring alongside Aamir Khan, Kareena Kapoor, R. Madhavan, and Sharman Joshi, Fazal played the role of an engineering student, Joy Lobo. The film received critical acclaim and emerged as the highest-grossing Bollywood film of all time up until then, grossing  worldwide.

In 2011, Fazal was picked up by Shah Rukh Khan's production house, Red Chillies Entertainment for the Roshan Abbas–directed romance film Always Kabhi Kabhi. Appearing opposite Giselli Monteiro, Fazal plays the role of Sameer Khanna and had to lose 15 kilos for the role. The film received negative response from the critics and was a box-office failure. While Komal Nahta of Koimoi said Fazal acted reasonably well, Gaurav Malani from The Times of India picked him as best in the cast. Later in an interview, Fazal said that doing the film was not a good decision.

 2013–present 
Fazal's first release in 2013 was in a coming-of-age comedy film Fukrey, in which he portrayed the role of Zafar, a struggling musician. The film along with his performance received mixed responses from critics. Nishi Tiwari from Rediff.com said he wore a "dazed expression" throughout the film, and Saibal Chatterjee from NDTV felt his role was "underwritten".

The same year, Fazal appeared in the romantic comedy film Baat Bann Gayi, which was considered a parody of Shakespeare's The Comedy of Errors. He portrayed the dual roles of Kabir, a successful novelist from Singapore, and Rasiya Bihari, a local don. The film met with negative reactions from critics and failed at the box office, though Fazal was praised for his acting. Faheem Ruhani from India Today considered him an upcoming talent to "watch out for", while The Times of India affirmed he is "standing out" from the cast.

In 2014, Fazal appeared in a supporting role opposite Vidya Balan in the comedy-drama Bobby Jasoos. Initially, Fazal refused the role since he felt he had "nothing much to do in it", but later agreed because of the "unusual romance" between him and Balan. Fazal's role as Tasawur, a popular local TV anchor who helps a Hyderabadi woman who aspires to be a detective (played by Balan), was well received. Taran Adarsh of Bollywood Hungama described Fazal as a "complete revelation": "Although pitted against a powerhouse performer like Vidya, Ali makes his presence felt with a wonderful performance".

The same year he appeared in the film Sonali Cable opposite Rhea Chakraborty, where he portrayed the role of Raghu. Fazal did his first on-screen intimate scene for a song in the film along with Chakraborty. His acting received mixed response from critics, where many criticised him for "recent stereotyped roles". Mohar Basu from Koimoi commented, "Ali Fazal is not even close to what he is capable of. The actor has good potential and this film fails to unleash it", though Renuka Vyavahare of The Times of India felt he was "likeable in his character". Both films received mixed to negative response from critics and were declared to be box office flops.

Fazal next took the lead role in the psychological horror thriller Khamoshiyan (2015). He portrayed the role of Kabir, an alcoholic novelist, whose failed career and relationship forced him to move to Kashmir in search of an inspirational story. The film was a critical failure, though Fazal's performance was well received. Bollywood Hungama said: "He has a wide range of emotions that effortlessly inhabit his face". The Hindu critic Arjun Kumar described him as a "natural performer with effective screen presence". Reportedly, Fazal was offered a role in the American political thriller television series Homeland, but he had to reject the offer since he had already commenced shooting for Khamoshiyan and ultimately the role went to Nimrat Kaur.

Fazal made his Hollywood film debut with a special appearance in the action film Furious 7, the seventh installment in The Fast and the Furious film series. In the film review, The Hindu wrote: "Ali Fazal turns up in a fleeting cameo and before we could breath[sic] in his presence he is ejected out of the scenery". Fazal said that he had only three scenes, but Subhash K. Jha from Bollywood Hungama considered those scenes "delightful". But it must be considered as a part of the story in furious as the friend of Ramsey.

Fazal was next seen in an Indo-American film, For Here Or To Go? which revolves around two Indian immigrants who find it difficult to build a successful life away from home. The film was played at many international film festivals. That same year, Fazal played the leading role in the Yash Raj Films youth studio Y-Films web series Bang Baaja Baaraat.

In 2016 Fazal played in Anand L. Rai's Happy Bhag Jayegi opposite Abhay Deol and Diana Penty. The film was a critical and commercial success. Fazal featured alongside Kalki Koechlin, in Soni Razdan's Love Affair, a fictionalised version of the 1959 Nanavati murder case. In addition, he has committed to star opposite Shriya Saran in Prakash Raj's romantic comedy Tadka.

In 2017, Fazal appeared in the sequel Fukrey Returns. He also starred in the British-American film Victoria & Abdul, which depicts the relationship of Queen Victoria (Judi Dench) and her confidant, Indian servant Abdul Karim.

In 2018, he appeared in the spin-off  Happy Phirr Bhag Jayegi and  played Guddu Pandit in the web series Mirzapur.

In 2019, he was cast in Milan Talkies, Prassthanam, and Netflix film House Arrest.

In 2020 he continued his role of Guddu Pandit in Mirzapur season 2. He has also been cast in the film Death on the Nile'' as Andrew Katchadouriaan, a film based on Agatha Christie's novel of the same name.

In 2021 he turned producer. He started his own film production company named Pushing Buttons Studios with Richa Chadha.

Filmography

Films

Television

Short films

Music videos

Awards and nominations

See also 

 Pankaj Tripathi
 Rashika Dugal
 Vikrant Massey
 Shriya Pilgaonkar
 Rajesh Tailang
 Sheeba Chaddha

References

External links 

 
 
 

1986 births
Living people
Indian male film actors
Male actors in Hindi cinema
St. Xavier's College, Mumbai alumni
The Doon School alumni
Indian male stage actors
21st-century Indian male actors
Male actors from Uttar Pradesh
Indian male models